The Family is a public art work by artist Joseph Puccetti that depicts an abstract man, woman and child encircled by a ring. It was originally located in front of the West Allis City Hall in downtown West Allis, Wisconsin. In 2006, the sculpture was moved to the West Allis Public Library. The sculpture is made of stainless steel.  The work was donated by the artist.

References

1982 sculptures
Outdoor sculptures in Milwaukee
Articles containing video clips
Stainless steel sculptures in the United States
Abstract sculptures in the United States
Sculptures of children in the United States
Sculptures of men in Wisconsin
Sculptures of women in Wisconsin